Shijie Yi Ethnic Township (十街彝族乡) is a Yi ethnic township in Yimen County, Yunnan, China. 

Township-level divisions of Yuxi
Yimen County
Yi ethnic townships